Afzelechin is a flavan-3-ol, a type of flavonoid. It can be found in Bergenia ligulata ( Paashaanbhed in Ayurveda traditional Indian medicine). It exists as at least 2 major epimers (afzelechin and epi-afzelechin).

Metabolism
(2R,3S)-catechin:NADP+ 4-oxidoreductase transforms cis-3,4-leucopelargonidin into afzelechin.

Glycosides 
Arthromerin A (afzelechin-3-O-β-D-xylopyranoside) and arthromerin B (afzelechin-3-O-β-D-glucopyranoside) are afzelechin glycosides isolated from the roots of the fern Arthromeris mairei. (+)-afzelechin-O-β-4'-D-glucopyranoside can be isolated from the rhizomes of the fern Selliguea feei.

Proanthocyanidins
 dimers
Afzelechin-(4alpha→8)-afzelechin (molecular formula : C30H26O10, molar mass : 546.52 g/mol, exact mass : 546.152597, CAS number : 101339-37-1, Pubchem CID : 12395) is a B type proanthocyanidin.
Ent-epiafzelechin-3-O-p-hydroxybenzoate-(4α→8,2α→O→7)-epiafzelechin) is an A-type proanthocyanidin found in apricots (Prunus armeniaca).
 Trimers
Selligueain A (epiafzelechin-(4β-8,2β-0-7)-epiafzelechin-(4β-8)-afzelechin) is an A type proanthocyanidin.

References

Flavanols
Resorcinols